Libida or Ibida was an ancient settlement in Scythia Minor, today's Dobruja region of modern Romania. It is within the commune of Slava Cercheză, in the village of Slava Rusă.
The settlement existed in Getic times (4th century BC). Its growing importance as a centre of commerce led to the construction of the fortified town during the reign of the Tetrarchy and Constantine the Great.
 
It was tentatively identified by V. Pârvan as polis Ibida, a town briefly mentioned by Procopius as one of those repaired by Justinian (De aed. IV,7). A. Aricescu identified it as Libida, based on a short passage from Theophylactus Simocatta. The town and area around was abandoned in the 7th cent. AD after the Bulgar invasions.

Archeological history
In 1875 an inscription found on the site was published. In 1885 Dimitrie C. Butculescu executed a first archeologic sondage. Requested 
by Grigore Tocilescu, the town was described by topograph Pamfil Polonic in 1897, who identified 33 towers and 3 gates, but 
there was not publication. In 1908 Raymund Netzhammer published a description of the town similar to the 1897 version. Vasile Pârvan identified the settlement in 1911 as Ibida. Constantin Moisil names the town in 1916 when a treasure of drachmes was found. In 1917 the Bulgar lieutenant Iconomof performed excavations and found the remains of a Basilica with 3 naves. In 1926, George G. Mateescu performed new excavations with unpublished results. Research in 1953 by a team exploring Histria, north and west of the town, of led to the discovery of Getic and Roman-Byzantine bricks and pottery and bronze coins from the Justinian I era. In 1977 Al. S. Stefan with a photogrammetry process restored the plan of the archaeological area. In 1988 A. Opait observed seven levels of living, three from the early Roman and four in the Roman-Byzantine period. From 2001 onwards ICEM (Institutul de Cercetări Eco-Muzeale Tulcea) started systematic excavations.

Bibliography
 Pârvan, V. 1912, Ulmetum I. Descoperirile primei campanii de săpături din vara anului 1911, AARMSI 2, 34, p. 497–607.
 Pârvan, V. 1923, Începuturile vieţii romane la Gurile Dunării, București. 
 Barnea, I. 1968, Perioada Dominatului (sec. IV – VII), în Vulpe, R., Barnea, I., Din istoria Dobrogei. II. Romanii la Dunărea de Jos,București. 
 Suceveanu, Al., Barnea, Al. 1991, La Dobroudja Roumaine – București.

See also
 Histria
 List of ancient towns in Scythia Minor

References

External links
 Mysterious fortress watching over the ruins of the old town Ibida – Slava Rusă 
 D. Paraschiv, I. Iaţcu, The Christian Basilica of Ibida. Elements of Interior Decoration
 Archeological Site Ibida 

Former populated places in Romania